Magnolia is a food and beverage brand owned by San Miguel Corporation (SMC) and used by its various subsidiaries. The brand was commercially established by SMC (then known as San Miguel Brewery) as an ice cream brand in 1925.

History

The history of the Magnolia brand can be traced back to 1899 when an American by the name of William J. Schober arrived in the Philippines as a cook in the United States Army. After the Philippine–American War, Schober would remain in the Philippines and introduced the "magnolia pie", "magnolia ice cream" and "magnolia ice-drop". In 1925, Schober sold his "magnolia" business interests to SMC (then known as San Miguel Brewery). Schober would move on to establish Legaspi Garden Restaurant at Pier 7, Port Area, Manila (the location is now the headquarters of Philippine Coast Guard), behind the Manila Hotel.

Under SMC, the dairy plant at 526 Calle Aviles in the San Miguel district of Manila stood on the same street as the site of the original San Miguel brewery (6 Calle Aviles). In 1926, the dairy plant was relocated to Calle Echague (now C. Palanca Sr., Street) in Quiapo, Manila. In 1970, production was transferred to a new modern facility in Aurora Boulevard, Quezon City, known as the Magnolia Dairy Products Plant. The facility, designed by National Artist Leandro Locsin also housed the main branch of its Magnolia ice cream parlor.

In 1972, SMC entered the poultry business with its first breeder farm in Cavite. The following year, SMC established its first chicken processing plant in Muntinlupa to produce Magnolia Fresh Chicken. The poultry business, along with its B-Meg feeds business were operated as the Feeds and Livestock Division of SMC until it was spun-off as a new subsidiary (San Miguel Foods, Inc.) in 1991.

In 1981, SMC spun off its butter and margarine production to a new subsidiary named Philippine Dairy Products Corporation (now known as Magnolia, Inc.), a joint-venture with New Zealand Dairy Board, with its production facility based in the Aurora Boulevard plant.

In 1996, SMC transferred its ice cream and milk businesses to a new company, Magnolia-Nestlé Corporation, a joint-venture with Nestlé. SMC retained ownership of the Magnolia brand since it was also being used by other SMC products. SMC also retained ownership of the Aurora Boulevard property. In 1998, SMC withdrew from the Magnolia-Nestlé venture and a non-compete clause barred it from the ice cream and milk businesses for five years. Upon the expiration of the non-compete clause in 2004, SMC revived its ice cream and milk businesses through its subsidiary, Magnolia, Inc.

In 2008, SMC sold the Aurora Boulevard property to Robinsons Land Corporation (RLC), a subsidiary of JG Summit Holdings, Inc. News reports cited that the property was sold reportedly in the amount of P1.6 billion. The property was developed by RLC into a mall (Robinsons Magnolia) and residential condominiums (The Magnolia Residences). One of the mall’s first establishments was a Magnolia-franchised ice cream parlor named Magnolia Flavor House, which operated from 2012 to 2017, as a fitting homage to the property’s roots.

On May 19, 2010, Magnolia, Inc. inaugurated its main ice cream production facility in Santa Rosa, Laguna.

Magnolia branded products
Magnolia, Inc.:
 Ice Cream – Magnolia Classic, Magnolia Classic Medley, Magnolia Gold Label, Magnolia Double Gold, Magnolia Sorbetes, Magnolia No Sugar Added, Magnolia Chocolait Ice Cream, Magnolia Limited Edition Super Premium President's Tub, Magnolia Best of the Philippines, Magnolia Yogurt Ice Cream
 Frozen Novelties – Magnolia Popsies, Magnolia Spinner, Magnolia Pinipig Crunch, Magnolia Sweetie Bites, Magnolia Cookie Monster, Magnolia Fun Bar, Magnolia Fizz, Magnolia K-Pop, Magnolia Yogurt Ice Cream
 Milk – Magnolia Fresh Milk, Magnolia Low Fat Milk, Magnolia Full Cream Milk, Magnolia Chocolait, Magnolia Chocolait Choco Magic (discontinued)
 Butter – Magnolia Gold, Magnolia Gold Lite, Magnolia Butter-licious Dairy Blend
 Margarine – Magnolia Baker's Best, Magnolia Buttercup, Magnolia Dari Creme, Magnolia Lite, Magnolia Star (co-branded)
 Cheese – Magnolia Daily Quezo, Magnolia Cheddar, Magnolia Cheezee, Magnolia Cheezee Spread, Magnolia Cream Cheese, Magnolia Cream Cheese Spread, Magnolia Gold Edam, Magnolia Queso de Bola (available during the Christmas season), Magnolia Quickmelt
 Cream – Magnolia All-Purpose Cream
 Salad Aid – Magnolia Real Mayonnaise, Magnolia Sandwich Spread, Magnolia All-Purpose Dressing, Magnolia Dip n' Dressing
 Cooking Oil – Magnolia Nutri-Oil, Magnolia Pure Oil
 Jelly Snacks – Magnolia Jellyace
 Foodservice – Magnolia Foodservice

San Miguel Mills, Inc.:
 Baking products – Magnolia All-Purpose Flour, Magnolia Cake Mixes (Magnolia Fast & Easy Bake, Magnolia Pancake Plus, Magnolia Pancake & Waffle Mix)

San Miguel Foods, Inc:
 Poultry – Magnolia Fresh Chicken, Magnolia Free Range Fresh Chicken, Magnolia Fresh Brown Eggs

San Miguel Brewery, Inc.:
 Non-alcoholic beverages – Magnolia Fruit Drink, Magnolia Health Tea, Magnolia PureWater

Trademark dispute

In the United States, Ramar Foods International, a company founded in 1969 and based in Pittsburg, California, markets its own line of ice cream under the Magnolia trademark "since 1972" using a logo identical to that created and used by SMC. The company has no connection with SMC.

SMC currently exports its ice cream in the US and Canada under the San Miguel Gold Label brand and its line of butter, margarine and cheese to the US under the Magnolia brand. In a decision dated August 27, 2015, the Ninth Circuit U.S. Court of Appeals denied the appeal filed by Ramar on the March 2013 judgment of the U.S. District Court for the Central District of California in favor of SMC regarding the use of the Magnolia brand on its butter, margarine and cheese products. Additionally, the Court of Appeals had reversed the injunction issued by the District Court that prevented SMC from using the Magnolia brand for new Magnolia food products in the United States. It noted that Ramar had failed to prove that it suffered any irreparable injury by SMC's use of the Magnolia trademark on its products in the United States. In rendering the decision, the US Court of Appeals recognized that SMC was using the Magnolia brand on its butter, margarine and cheese products to invoke the goodwill that SMC had built in the Philippines, not the goodwill created by Ramar in the United States.

Relation to other Magnolia brands (Singapore and US)

Although similar in name and product line (dairy products), there is no affiliation between SMC's Magnolia brand with that of the Singapore-based Fraser and Neave Ltd., whose own Magnolia brand was established in Singapore in 1937 and currently known as F&N Magnolia. 

There is also no relation between SMC's Magnolia brand with that of Borden, Inc. (Magnolia canned milk).

References

External links
 San Miguel Pure Foods Company, Inc
 Magnolia, Inc.
 Magnolia Ice Cream
 Magnolia Chocolait
 Magnolia Chicken
 Magnolia Healthy Beverages

San Miguel Corporation brands
Ice cream brands
Ice cream parlors
Products introduced in 1925
Food brands of the Philippines